My Blood My Compromise is a feature documentary film on Kosovo by Albanian-American director Nuhi de Stani.

Synopsis 
The director, Nuhi de Stani uses a wide range of interviews to delve into the very complicated conflict in Kosovo during the demise of Yugoslavia. The story is told in three parts: a brief history, the crimes against humanity and the 2008 Kosovo declaration of independence. The history aspect of the story is told by author of Kosovo: A Short History, Noel Malcolm. The crimes against humanity aspect is told through Luljeta Selimi, who created a women's foundation that provides help to women and children who were raped during the conflict. The quest for independence is channeled through Albin Kurti, a leading activist and leader of the Vetëvendosje  movement and current serving Prime Minister of Kosovo.

Film Festivals
 Titanic Budapest International Film Festival World Premiere
 Brooklyn International Film Festival United States Premiere
 Milano Film Festival Italian Premiere
 Montreal Human Rights Film Festival Canadian Premiere

Release and distribution 
The final version of My Blood My Compromise was released in January, 2010 through the National Film Network.

Critical reviews
My Blood My Compromise has been reviewed and recommended by K. Fennessy of Video Librarian Magazine.
"...The filmmaker also talks with a U.N. representative, a member of the Serbian parliament, experts on ethnic cleansing, and ordinary Kosovans who recount their experiences fighting and defending themselves against the Serbs (one mother remains too traumatized to speak). The destruction of property and disruption of lives would force many into Albania and Montenegro, leaving Kosovo a broken territory inhabited by people suffering from physical and emotional scars. DVD extras include deleted scenes and the short documentary, “In a Word, ‘Democracy’,” which looks at the treatment of Macedonian Albanians in the wake of independence."

References

External links
 http://mybloodmycompromise.com/

Works about the Kosovo War
2007 documentary films
Kosovo Serbs
Kosovo Albanians
Serbian–Albanian conflict
Cultural depictions of Slobodan Milošević
Films set in Kosovo
American documentary films
2000s English-language films
2000s American films